Bellevue is a neighbourhood in the city of Kristiansand in Agder county, Norway. It is located in the borough of Grim and in the district of Grim. Bellevue is southeast of Idda. The European route E18 highway runs along the east side of the neighborhood and the Norwegian National Road 9 runs just north of the neighborhood. National Archival Services of Norway for Southern Norway is located in Bellevue.

Transport

References

Geography of Kristiansand
Neighbourhoods of Kristiansand